Tennis events were contested at the 1979 Summer Universiade in Mexico City, Mexico.

Medal summary

Medal table

See also
 Tennis at the Summer Universiade

External links
World University Games Tennis on HickokSports.com

1979
Universiade
1979 Summer Universiade